Adrien Sibomana (born 4 September 1953, in Bukeye, Muramvya) was the prime minister of Burundi from 19 October 1988 until 10 July 1993. He was a member of UPRONA. He is an ethnic Hutu and was appointed by the Tutsi President Pierre Buyoya in an unsuccessful attempt to appease Hutus by giving a few high government posts to them. Sibomana was the first Hutu prime minister since 1973 and previously had been governor of Muramvya Province.

Retired from politics after this experience, he is currently leading the movement of organic agriculture in Burundi. He is an active member of KiliMohai   East African organic label, which is part of IFOAM East Africa. He declares being involved in organic agriculture since 2011.

References

1953 births
Living people
Union for National Progress politicians
Hutu people
People from Muramvya Province